The Thome Courtyard is an art center in Zhongzheng District, Taipei, Taiwan.

History
The art center used to be one of the student dormitory of National Taiwan University and residence of philosopher Thome H. Fang. The building was then renovated at a cost of NT$40 million. It was then opened to the public in November 2022.

Architecture
The art center is a Japanese architecture-style of building. It features a Japanese dry garden on the outside of the building.

Transportation
The art center is accessible within walking distance west of Guring Station of Taipei Metro.

See also
 List of tourist attractions in Taiwan

References

External links
  

2022 establishments in Taiwan
Art centers in Taipei
Residential buildings in Taiwan